Buck Island may refer to:

 Buck Island Reef National Monument near Saint Croix, U.S. Virgin Islands
 Buck Island National Wildlife Refuge near Saint Thomas, U.S. Virgin Islands
 Buck Island (British Virgin Islands)
 Buck Island (Oregon) in Upper Klamath Lake in Oregon
 Buck Island, one of the San Juan Islands
 Buck Island, County Fermanagh, a townland in County Fermanagh, Northern Ireland